Huband is a surname. Notable people with the surname include:

 Charles Huband, Manitoban politician
 Debbie Huband (born 1956), Canadian basketball player
 John Huband (disambiguation), multiple people

Other
 Huband (HBC vessel), operated by the HBC in 1687, see Hudson's Bay Company vessels